RRE Ventures is an American Venture Capital firm based in New York City. The firm primarily invests in seed, series A and series B rounds and focuses on companies operating in the software, internet, communications, aerospace, robotics, 3D printing and financial services sectors.

Background 

Stuart Ellman and James D. Robinson IV were classmates at Harvard Business school where they came up with the idea of starting a venture capital firm.

In 1994 they founded RRE Ventures with Robinson's father, James D. Robinson III who was the Chairman and CEO of American Express from 1977 until his retirement in 1993. The name of the firm is derived from the first letter of each co-founder's surname.

As of 2020, RRE ventures has raised $2 billion in capital. It has made over 400 investments across 26 states in the US and Canada with over 60 exits.

Funds

Notable investments 

 8i
 Activate
 Avant
 BarkBox
 Base CRM
 Bitly
 BitPay
 Boom Technology
 Booster Fuels
 Braintree
 Business Insider
 Buzzfeed
 Citizen
 Clearpath Robotics
 Clubhouse Software
 Concur
 Datadog
 Digital Currency Group
 Drop.io
 Electric Cloud
 Giphy
 Huffington Post
 i.TV
 Makerbot
 Managed by Q
 NerdWallet
 Nomad Health
 numberFire
 Olo
 OnDeck Capital
 Proofpoint
 Quirky
 Ripple Labs
 SocialFlow
 Spaceflight Industries
 Spire Global
 Symantec
 The Outline
 The Skimm
 TheSquareFoot
 tvtag
 Understory
 Venmo
 Vine
 Watchguard
 Whiptail
 WisdomTree Investments
 Xobni

References

External links
 www.rre.com (Company Website)

American companies established in 1994
Financial services companies based in New York City
Financial services companies established in 1994
Investment companies based in New York City
Venture capital firms of the United States